Brothers in Unity (formally, the Society of Brothers in Unity) is an undergraduate society at Yale University. Founded in 1768 as a literary and debating society that encompassed nearly half the student body at its 19th-century peak, the group disbanded in the late 1870s after donating its collection of books to help form Yale's central library. It was revived in 2021 as a secret society by members of the senior class and alumni.

History

First incarnation (1768-late 1870s)

The Society of Brothers in Unity at Yale College was founded in 1768 by 21 members of the Yale classes of 1768, 1769, 1770 and 1771. The society was founded chiefly to reduce class separation among literary societies; at the time, Yale freshmen were not "received into any Society", and junior society members were forced into the servitude of seniors "under dread of the severest penalties". David Humphreys, a freshman of the class of 1771, persuaded two members of the senior class, three junior class members, two sophomores, and 14 freshmen to support the society's founding.
The society's unorthodox class composition was apparently challenged by other literary groups at Yale College. According to its 1841 catalogue of members, Brothers in Unity only became an independent institution after surviving "an incessant war" waged by "two or three" traditional societies that did not support the concept of a four-year debating community. It is speculated that this struggle initiated the Brothers' century-long rivalry with the older Linonian Society, which previously did not include freshman. Within a year, Brothers in Unity became fully independent, its popularity influencing other societies to reconsider their exclusion of first-year students. The Yale College freshman class of 1771 yielded 15 members of Brothers in Unity, while Linonia accepted four; the first noted point in which underclassmen were publicly accepted into a Yale society.

Between its founding and 1841, the society is said to have followed the template of other debating societies, although operating under "Masonic secrecy," according to 19th-century Yale historian Ebenezer Baldwin. Baldwin wrote that the group, in conjunction with Linonia and the Calliopean Society, discussed "scientific questions" and gravitate towards "literary pursuits." This is substantiated by the Brothers' own public documentation, which says the society sought "lofty places in science, literature, and oratory" fields, as well as general "intellectual improvement."

By the beginning of the 19th century, most Yale College students joined either the Brothers or Linonia. "While the official curriculum remained extraordinarily rigid, the student body built a rich extracurriculum through the literary societies that allowed them to explore subjects that would normally have no place in the college," wrote Elizabeth James in 2015. "Research papers, debates, and literary exercises gave vitality to intellectual life within the college. The societies provided a place where student voices and opinions could be heard, and their questions or thoughts about the world around them interrogated by their classmates." The societies thereby helped pave Yale's way toward a broader European model of education.

Both groups held expansive literary collections, which they used to compete against each other. Between 1780 and 1841, the Brothers claimed to own more volumes than Linonia, although these assertions are disputed. Despite their rivalry, the two societies described each other as "ornaments" of Yale and "generous rivals."

Members of the group between 1768 and 1841 include 26 Yale valedictorians, several Supreme Court justices (one Chief Justice), six governors, 13 Senators, 45 Congressional representatives, a Secretary of the Navy, a Secretary of the Treasury, a Postmaster General, 14 presidents of colleges and universities, two United States Attorney Generals, and a U.S. Vice President: John C. Calhoun (1804). In its catalogue, the Brotherhood also asserts: "Every President of the United States, with the exception of two, has had in his cabinet one of our members, and the governor's chair of our own state has been filled for twenty years with Brothers in Unity."

The Brothers adopted the motto  ("From small things come great things") in 1768 or 1769.

When Yale built its first central library in 1846, Linonia and Brothers in Unity accepted the library's invitation to house their own collections in the new building. For several decades, the collections were maintained separately, each with its librarian, staff, catalogs, and building entrance. The societies first proposed to donate their collections to Yale in 1860, and this was finally done in 1871.

The donation is commemorated in the Linonia and Brothers Room of Yale's Sterling Memorial Library. The reading room contains the Linonia and Brothers (L&B) collection, a travel collection, a collection devoted to medieval history, and books recently added to Sterling’s collections.

Brothers in Unity disbanded after the library donation; various sources say this happened in 1871, 1872, and 1878.

Second incarnation (2021-present) 

In 2021, 21 "members of Yale joined together to revive the defunct society", albeit in different form. While the original Brothers had a relatively open admissions policy and a large membership, its new incarnation appears to more closely resemble Yale's restrictive and far smaller secret societies and to mimic the organization's original "Masonic secrecy", as Baldwin put it.

That November, the website said the group "was revived in 2021 to support undergraduates of Yale University, who share a common passion for public service, whether it be the U.S Intelligence Community, the U.S Armed Forces, the U.S Foreign Service and/or the U.S Congress." The website also said the group considers people "who have a professional history or demonstrated interest in the field of public/military service. Under exceptional circumstances, some Brothers will be considered for their excellence in entrepreneurship and business leadership. Brothers exemplify the spirit of David Humphreys and the society's many alumni in government."

In 2021, the group hosted a lecture named for Morrison Waite, who as the seventh chief justice of the U.S. Supreme Court helped strike down the Civil Rights Act of 1875.

In November 2022, a new version of the site said, "The society debates frequently and maintains a focus on inviting speakers to discuss important matters in contemporary foreign policy, politics, literature, and entrepreneurship." It also said: "There are currently 95 alumni and current brothers in the society."

In 2022, the society donated photographs and documents concerning its revival to the Yale University Library's Manuscript and Archives collection.

The Brotherhood elects ten brothers every spring. A current Yale professor acts as an ex-officio member to advise the society. The society is funded by the 1768 Foundation Inc., a 501(c)(3) public charity administered by alumni.

Prominent alumni
Name (class year): distinction
David Humphreys (1771): American Revolutionary War colonel and aide to George Washington. Served as the American ambassador to Portugal, was a member of the Hartford Wits, and was an entrepreneur who brought Merino sheep to America.
John Brown of Pittsfield (1771): First to alert George Washington to the defection plot of Benedict Arnold during the Revolutionary War. Founding member of Brothers in Unity.
William Hull (1772): General in the War of 1812, appointed by Thomas Jefferson as governor of Michigan, soldier in Revolutionary War.
Benjamin Tallmadge (1773): Spymaster and leader of the Culper Ring, Continental Army captain, U.S. representative.
Chauncey Goodrich (1776): Senator and representative of Connecticut, 8th lieutenant governor of Connecticut.
Moses Cleaveland (1777): Founded Cleveland, Ohio. Surveyed the Western Reserve. Brigadier general of Connecticut militia. 
Joel Barlow (1778): Ambassador to France, drafted the Treaty of Tripoli in 1796.
Oliver Wolcott Jr. (1778): U.S. Secretary of the Treasury and 24th governor of Connecticut.
William Edmond (1778): Successor to James Davenport as U.S. representative from Connecticut. Revolutionary War soldier.
Uriah Tracy (1778): First to respond to the Lexington Alarm during the early American Revolutionary War. U.S. senator and representative from Connecticut.
Noah Webster (1778): U.S. founding father, author of Merriam-Webster dictionary.
Ezekiel Gilbert (1778): U.S. representative from New York.
Mason Fitch Cogswell (1780): Prominent surgeon, pioneer of French sign language in United States.
Israel Smith (1781): Governor of Vermont, senator, and U.S. representative.
Ray Greene (1784): U.S. senator and Attorney General from Rhode Island.
Thomas R. Gold (1786): U.S. representative from New York.
Christopher Ellery (1787): U.S. senator from Rhode Island.
Gideon Granger (1787): 4th U.S. Postmaster General under John Adams and Thomas Jefferson.
William Ely (1787): U.S. representative from Massachusetts.
James Lanman (1788): U.S. senator from Connecticut. Namesake of Lanman-Wright Hall in the Old Campus of Yale University.
Peter Buell Porter (1791): Served as the 12th U.S. Secretary of War under president John Quincy Adams. 11th Secretary of State of New York. U.S. representative.
John Elliott (1794): U.S. senator from Georgia.
Benjamin Silliman (1796): Prolific chemist and scientist; the first person to distill petroleum, and a founder of the American Journal of Science, the oldest scientific journal in the United States. Namesake of Silliman College at Yale and the mineral Sillimanite.
Henry Baldwin (1797): Supreme Court justice and U.S. Representative.
James Burnet (1798): First Yale valedictorian.
Henry Meigs (1799): U.S. Senator from New York.
Thomas Hill Hubbard (1799): Three-time presidential elector and two-time U.S. representative.
Thomas J. Oakley (1801): U.S. representative from New York, later became an Attorney General for New York.
Jeremiah Evarts (1802): Christian missionary, reformer, and activist for the rights of Native Americans, and a leading opponent of the Indian removal policy of the United States government.
James Gadsden (1806): Namesake of the Gadsden Purchase, a U.S. purchase of Mexican land; Adjutant General of the U.S. Army.
Samuel Morse (1810): Inventor of Morse code, helped develop telegraphy. Namesake of Yale's Morse College.
John Davis (1812): Two-time governor of Massachusetts in 1834 and 1841, U.S. senator and representative.
William Channing Woodbridge (1812): Geographer and educational reformer.
John M. Clayton (1815): 18th U.S. Secretary of State, U.S. senator.
George Edmund Badger (1816, but did not graduate): 12th U.S. Secretary of the Navy, U.S. senator.
Theodore Dwight Woolsey (1820): President of Yale College, prolific author and academic.
Leonard Bacon (1820): Influential abolitionist and Congregational preacher.
Henry Durant (1827): Created the University of California. 16th mayor of Oakland, California.
William Strong (1828): Supreme Court justice.
Alphonso Taft (1833): 31st U.S. Secretary of War, 34th U.S. Attorney General, founder of Skull and Bones; advocated against anti-African American voting laws.
Morrison Waite (1837): 7th Chief Justice of the U.S. Supreme Court, champion of education opportunities for Blacks.
Stephen Clark Foster (1840): First American Mayor of Los Angeles.
Yung Wing (1854): First Chinese student to graduate from an American university, businessman, Brothers in Unity librarian.
Richard Henry Green (1857): First African American to graduate from Yale.
John William Sterling (1864): Founder of Shearling & Sterling LLP. Major benefactor of Yale. University's main library named in his honor.
Thomas Thacher (1872): Lawyer, president of the Yale Alumni Association, president of the Yale Club of New York City.

References

Yale University Library
Secret societies at Yale
Student debating societies
College literary societies in the United States